Get Wet is the debut studio album by American electronic dance music band Krewella. It was released in the United States on September 24, 2013, by Columbia Records. This is their only album with former member, Kris Trindl, who later resigned from the group in 2014. It was preceded by the singles "Killin' It", "Come & Get It", "Alive", "Live for the Night" and "Enjoy the Ride".

Chart performance
Get Wet debuted at number eight on the Billboard 200, with 27,000 copies sold in its first week. The album made its debut at number forty on the New Zealand Albums Chart.

Track listing
All tracks written by Kristopher Trindl, Jahan Yousaf and Yasmine Yousaf except 10 which was co-written by Toby Gad. All tracks produced by Rain Man except 1, 8, 12, and where noted.

Charts

Weekly charts

Year-end charts

Release history

References

2013 debut albums
Krewella albums
Columbia Records albums